...The Stories We Could Tell is the eighth studio album by American hard rock band Mr. Big, the second since their 2010 reunion album What If.... It was recorded with producer Pat Regan (Kiss, Deep Purple, Warrant, Keel), and features 13 new studio recordings, including "Gotta Love the Ride", "The Man Who Has Everything", "Just Let Your Heart Reside", and "I Forget to Breathe". The European edition also includes a live version of "Addicted to That Rush", while the Japanese release features a live version of "30 Days in the Hole" from Mr. Big. The album was issued by Frontiers Records in the US and Europe.

Track listing

Personnel
Mr. Big
Eric Martin – lead & backing vocals
Paul Gilbert – guitar, backing vocals
Billy Sheehan – bass guitar, backing vocals
Pat Torpey – drum programming, percussion, backing vocals

Production
Pat Regan – producer, engineer, orchestration
Devin Kennedy-Pavelock – assistant engineer
Larry Freemantle – art direction
Larry Di Marzio, William Hames – photography

References

External links

2014 albums
Mr. Big (American band) albums
Frontiers Records albums